The Kollam City Police is the law enforcement agency concerned with the maintenance of law and order in the Indian city of Kollam and the municipalities of Karunagappalli (Karunagappally division) and Paravur(Chathannoor division) along with several towns in Kollam district. Kollam City Police is the first ISO 9001 certified law enforcement agency in Kerala state and second one in India. The Kollam City Police has about 2,200 officers and handles an average of 35000 cases per year.

History
In the pre-independence era, Kerala was divided into princely states of Travancore and Cochin and the Malabar region for the smooth administration. There was no Commissionerate in Kollam until 2011. The whole district police was administered by DySP of Kollam, Karunagappally, Kottarakkara and Punalur. As per the Government Order no 32/2011/Home dated 5 February 2011, Kollam district police was divided into Kollam Urban Police District (Kollam City Police) and Kollam Rural Police District. The City Police is headed by a City Police Commissioner(CP), with its headquarters at Kollam. The rural police is headed by the District Police Chief (DPC), with its headquarters at Kottarakkara. Both heads report to the Inspector General of Police (IGP), Thiruvananthapuram Range (Kerala).  The Kollam City Police came into existence on 1March 2011 following the division of the Kollam District Police force into the Kollam City Police and the Kollam Rural Police.

Location 
The office of the Kollam's City Police Commissioner is situated near the Armed Reserve Police Force camp in Kollam Cantonment.

Administrative divisions
There are a total of 17 police stations under the control of Kollam City Police, eight of which are under the control of the Kollam Division with four further stations under Karunagappally and Chathannoor divisions respectively.

Kollam Division
 Kollam East Police Station
 Kollam West Police Station
 Pallithottam Police Station
 Anchalummoodu Police Station
 Sakthikulangara Police Station
 Eravipuram Police Station
 Kilikollur Police Station
 Kollam Traffic Police Station
 Kollam East Women Police Station

Chathannoor Division
 Paravur Police Station
 Chathannoor Police Station
 Kottiyam Police Station
 Kannanalloor Police Station
 Parippally Police Station

Karunagappally Division
 Karunagappally Police Station
 Oachira Police Station
 Chavara Police Station
 Chavara Thekkumbhagom Police Station

City Police Commissioners

The Office is presently headed by Smt. Merin Joseph IPS, Commissioner of Police, who is an Indian Police Service (IPS) officer, as administrative control vests with the Home Ministry of Kerala. Departments such as administration, the District Crime Records Bureau (DCRB), Crime Detachment and Special Branch are each headed by an Assistant commissioner.

 N. Gopalakrishnan IPS (1 March 2011 – 20 June 2011)
 T.J Jose IPS [DIG] (20 June 2011 – 9 January 2012)
 Gopesh Agrawal IPS [DIG] (9 January 2012 – 4 February 2012)
 Sam Christy Daniel [Addl. Charge] KPS (4 February 2012 – 21 February 2012)
 Debesh Kumar Behera IPS (21 February 2012 – 27 August 2014)
 V. Suresh Kumar IPS (27 August 2014 – 29 April 2015)
 P. Prakash IPS (29 April 2015 – 13 June 2016)
 S. Satheesh Bino IPS (13 June 2016 – 6 June 2017)
 Ajeetha Begum IPS (7 June 2017 – 17 January 2018)
 A. Sreenivas IPS (17 January 2018 – 8 May 2018)
 Arul B. Krishna IPS (8 May 2018 – 8 October 2018)
 P. K. Madhu IPS (8 October 2018 – 8 June 2019)
 Merin Joseph IPS (8 June 2019 – 18 September 2019)
 P. K. Madhu IPS (20 October 2019 – 17 January 2020)
 T. Narayanan IPS (18 January 2020 – 10 July 2022)
 Merin Joseph IPS (11 July 2022 – Present)

Developments 
 A dedicated complex at Asramam for the district police dog squad was inaugurated by Harshita Attaluri, the then Superintendent of Police on 2 March 2010. The facility cost  and can accommodate four dogs. The dog squad currently consists of three dogs. On 3 November 2016, a 10-member team of anti-goonda squad has been formed in Kollam city police. The team will supposedly be headed by a sub inspector.
 On 2 February 2021, Kerala's first district forensic science laboratory started functioning at Chathannoor in Kollam district. Physics, Biology and Chemistry, divisions started initially and a cyber forensic division will also be started in the lab shortly.

The first ISO 9001 accredited School in Kollam District, Kerala is Kalima International school .This Educational Institution located at Oyoor Roaduvila,Near Travancore Engineering College.

Notes

References

Government of Kerala
Metropolitan law enforcement agencies of India
Kerala Police
Government of Kollam
2011 establishments in Kerala
Government agencies established in 2011

ml:കേരള പോലീസ്